Njan Samvidhanam Cheyyum (English: I Will Direct) is a 2015 Indian Malayalam-language family drama film written, directed, and produced by Balachandra Menon. It stars Menon in the lead role, along with  Gayathri, Dakshina, Shankar, Menaka, Ravindran, and Madhu in supporting roles. The film was released on 19 September 2015 in India to negative critical response.

The film's story revolves around Krishna Das (Balachandra Menon), a middle-aged man who resigns from the National Film Development Corporation to become a director.

Cast

 Balachandra Menon as Krishna Das
 Gayathri as Gayathri Devi
 Dakshina
 Sreekanth Sasikanth
 Shankar
 Menaka
 Ravindran
 Madhu
 Vineeth
 Sunil Sukhada
 Sudheer Karamana
 Sasi Kalinga
 Kalabhavan Shajohn
 Sreelatha Namboothiri
 Renji Panicker
 G. Suresh Kumar
 Bhagyalakshmi
 P. Sreekumar
 Dharmajan Bolgatty
 Viji Thampi
 Tessa Joseph
 Ramkumar Uppatt
 Anoop Krishnan as Shyam

Critical reception
Sanjith Sidhardhan of The Times of India rated the film 2/5 and said, "Balachandra Menon's comeback movie follows a familiar plot that is riddled with cliches." He concluded the review saying, "Films with familiar themes had tasted success in recent times thanks to the way they were presented and that's where Njan Samvidhanam Cheyyum falls short. The frames are lifeless and sometimes repetitive. The movie could been a bit crisper and less tedious with some tight editing." Sify.com wrote that the film is a torture asking "How can someone (the producer) spend so much money for this kind of stupidity?

References

External links

Films directed by Balachandra Menon
2015 films
2010s Malayalam-language films
Films about filmmaking